The 1st Regiment of Life Guards was a cavalry regiment in the British Army, part of the Household Cavalry. It was formed in 1788 by the union of the 1st Troop of Horse Guards and 1st Troop of Horse Grenadier Guards. In 1922, it was amalgamated with the 2nd Life Guards to form the Life Guards.

History
The regiment was formed in 1788 by the union of the 1st Troop of Horse Guards and 1st Troop of Horse Grenadier Guards.  It fought in the Peninsular War and at the Waterloo. In 1877, it was renamed 1st Life Guards and contributed to the Household Cavalry Composite Regiment in the Anglo-Egyptian War, in the Second Boer War and in the First World War from August to November 1914. From 1916 to 1918, the Reserve Regiment contributed to the Household Battalion. In 1918, the regiment was converted to the 1st Battalion, Guards Machine Gun Regiment. It was reconstituted in 1919 and was amalgamated with the 2nd Life Guards in 1922 to form the Life Guards.

Battle honours
The battle honours of the regiment were:
 Early Wars: Dettingen, Peninsula, Waterloo, Tel-el-Kebir, Egypt 1882, Relief of Kimberley, Paardeberg, South Africa 1899–1900
 The Great War:  Mons, Le Cateau, Retreat from Mons, Marne 1914, Aisne 1914, Messines 1914, Armentières 1914, Ypres 1914 '15 '17, Langemarck 1914, Gheluvelt, Nonne Bosschen, St. Julien, Frezenberg, Somme 1916, Albert 1916, Arras 1917 '18, Scarpe 1917 '18, Broodseinde, Poelcappelle, Passchendaele, Hindenburg Line, Cambrai 1918, France and Flanders 1914–18

Colonels-in-Chief
The Colonels-in-Chief of the regiment were:
1815–1830: King George IV
1831–1837: King William IV
1837–1880: vacant
1880–1910: F.M. The Prince of Wales, later HM King Edward VII
1910–1922: F.M. King George V

Regimental Colonels
The colonels of the regiment were:
1788–1789: Gen. William John Kerr, 5th Marquess of Lothian, KT
1789–1792: Gen. Sir Joseph Yorke, 1st Baron Dover, KB
1792–1829: Gen. Charles Stanhope, 3rd Earl of Harrington, GCH
1829–1865: F.M. Sir Stapleton Cotton, 1st Viscount Combermere, GCB, GCH, KSI 
1865–1888: F.M. George Charles Bingham, 3rd Earl of Lucan, GCB
1888–1902: F.M. Prince William Augustus Edward of Saxe-Weimar, KP, GCB, GCVO
1902–1907: Lt-Gen. Dudley FitzGerald-de Ros, 24th Baron de Ros, KP, KCVO
1907–1920: F.M. Sir Francis Grenfell, 1st Baron Grenfell, GCB, GCMG 
1920–1922: F.M. Sir Edmund Henry Hynman Allenby, 1st Viscount Allenby, GCB, GCMG, GCVO

See also
British cavalry during the First World War
 Life Guards

References

Sources
 

1-001 Regiment of Life Guards
LG1
Household Cavalry
Former guards regiments
Military units and formations established in 1788
Military units and formations disestablished in 1922